John Thomas Parnham (6 September 1856 – 18 February 1908) was an English first-class cricketer and umpire.

Parnham was born at Bottesford, Leicestershire. He made his debut in first-class cricket for a United Eleven against the touring Australians in 1882 at Tunbridge Wells. The following season he made three first-class appearances, playing twice for the Marylebone Cricket Club (MCC) against Oxford University and Cambridge University, and once for The Rest against a combined Nottinghamshire and Yorkshire cricket team at Bradford. He played once in 1885 for the MCC against Sussex, before playing for the North in the North v South fixtures of 1886 and 1887. His final first-class appearance came in 1889, for the MCC against Cambridge University at Fenner's. An all-rounder, he scored a total of 178 runs at an average of 19.77, with a high score of 90 not out for the North in 1886. With his slow left-arm orthodox bowling, he took 16 wickets at a bowling average of 18.37. His best figures of 7 for 25 came on his first-class debut for the United Eleven, with Parnham taking 5 for 101 in the Australians first-innings and 7 for 25 in their second-innings. Besides playing, Parnham stood as an umpire in three first-class matches during the 1880s, before later standing in four matches in the 1903 Minor Counties Championship. He died in February 1908 at Church, Lancashire.

References

External links

1856 births
1908 deaths
People from Bottesford, Leicestershire
Cricketers from Leicestershire
English cricketers
United All-England Eleven cricketers
Marylebone Cricket Club cricketers
Non-international England cricketers
English cricket umpires
North v South cricketers